Ahmed Rafiq (born 12 September 1929) is a Bangladeshi language movement activist, writer and researcher on Rabindranath Tagore and his literature. He achieved Ekushey Padak in 1995 by the Government of Bangladesh. Tagore Research Institute in Kolkata conferred the Rabindratattacharya title on him in 2011.

Early life and career
Rafiq was born on 12 September 1929 to Bengali Muslim parents Abdul Hamid and Rahima Khatun in the village of Shahbazpur in Sarail, then part of the Brahmanbaria subdivision of the Bengal Province's Tipperah District. He completed his MBBS from Dhaka Medical College in 1958. He published his book of poems Nirbashita Nayak (1996) and book of essays Onek Ronger Akash (1966). He became a fellow of Bangla Academy and lifelong member of Asiatic Society of Bangladesh.

Awards
 Bangla Academy Literary Award (1979)
 Olokto Literature Award (1992)
 Ekushey Padak (1995)
 Bangla Academy Rabindra Award (2011)
 "Swadesh e Rabindra" from the Tagore Research Institute in Kolkata (2011)

Works
 Shishuder Rabindranath
 Kishorder Rabindranath
 Nirbachita Rabindranath

References

Living people
1929 births
Bangladeshi male writers
Bengali language movement activists
Bangladeshi scholars
Recipients of the Ekushey Padak
Recipients of Bangla Academy Award
People from Sarail Upazila